Marger (Serbian Cyrillic: Mapгep) is a neighborhood of the city of Niš, Serbia. It is located in Niš municipality of Medijana.

Location
Marger is in the central part of Niš. It is flat and bordered on the north by the neighborhood of Centar, and on the south by neighborhood of Palilula and Staro Groblje.

History
Marger is one of the oldest neighborhoods in Niš. There was an old café named "Marger" which gave the name to the neighborhood.

Characteristics
The neighborhood is residential and commercial.

Future development
There is a plan of construction of new city park in the neighborhood.

Neighborhoods of Niš